The Borough of Eaglehawk was a local government area which covered the northwestern suburbs of the regional city of Bendigo, Victoria, Australia.

History

Eaglehawk was first incorporated as a borough on 29 July 1862. It had nine councillors, who represented the entire borough.

On 7 April 1994, the Borough of Eaglehawk was abolished, and along with the City of Bendigo, the Rural City of Marong and the Shires of Huntly and Strathfieldsaye, was merged into the newly created City of Greater Bendigo.

Councillors met at the Town Hall, at the intersection of Sailors Gully Road and Loddon Valley Highway, Eaglehawk.

Population

* Estimate in the 1958 Victorian Year Book.

List of mayors

References

External links
 Victorian Places - Eaglehawk

Eaglehawk
1862 establishments in Australia
Bendigo